On 4 July 2003, 53 Hazara Shias were killed and at least 65 others were injured when the mosque was attacked during the Friday prayer in Quetta, Balochistan, Pakistan. When hundreds of worshipers were offering Friday prayer, three armed men entered the Asna Ashari Hazara Imambargah and started shooting, threw hand grenades and one suicide bomber blew himself up - which left 53 dead and tens of others injured. It was second major sectarian attack on Quetta's Hazaras after the massacre of police cadets. It was the start of the series of killings of Hazaras in Quetta.

Bombing
On 4 July 2003, hundreds of worshippers were practicing Friday prayer in Asna Ashri Hazara Imambargah Kalan mosque. Five men armed with automatic weapons entered the mosque and fired on worshippers for ten continuous minutes and tried to throw a grenade, but it exploded in his hand. Worshippers disarmed one of the attackers and killed a third one. The other two attackers ran away from the roof. This attack left more 65 dead and tens of others injured.

Perpetrators
Lashkar-e-Jhangvi (LeJ), a banned terrorist group, was responsible for the attack on the mosque. After investigations, intelligence agencies found a video compact disc in which two people are shown who claimed their people attacked the mosque and they were going to meet them in paradise.

Response
Pervez Musharraf, President of Pakistan at the time, cut short his 18-day trip to America and Europe. He was in a news conference in Paris when he heard the news. On his return to Islamabad, he said: 
In response, police in Quetta arrested around 19 culprits who were found to be involved in the attack.

See also
Persecution of Hazara people
2004 Quetta Ashura massacre
2011 Mastung bus shooting
September 2010 Quetta bombing
2011 Hazara Town shooting
2019 Ghotki riots

References

2003 murders in Pakistan
2003 mass shootings in Asia
2003 mosque bombing
21st-century mass murder in Pakistan
Attacks on buildings and structures in 2003
2003 mosque bombing
Mosque bombings in Asia
Attacks on religious buildings and structures in Pakistan
Attacks on Shiite mosques
Mosque bombings by Islamists
Islamic terrorist incidents in 2003
July 2003 crimes
July 2003 events in Pakistan
Lashkar-e-Jhangvi attacks
Mass murder in 2003
2003 mosque bombing
Mass shootings in Pakistan
Massacres in religious buildings and structures
Persecution of Hazaras
Suicide bombings in 2003
2003 mosque bombing
Terrorist incidents in Pakistan in 2003
Violence against Shia Muslims in Pakistan
Building bombings in Pakistan